Thelypteris palustris, the marsh fern, or eastern marsh fern, is a species of fern native to eastern North America and across Eurasia. It prefers to grow in marshy situations in full sun.
The species epithet palustris is Latin for "of the marsh" and indicates its common habitat.
It is the only known host plant for Fagitana littera, the marsh fern moth.

Subtaxa
The following subspecies are accepted:
Thelypteris palustris subsp. palustris
Thelypteris palustris subsp. pubescens

References

Thelypteridaceae
Ferns of the Americas
Ferns of Asia
Ferns of Europe
Flora of Asia
Flora of Europe
Plants described in 1821